Robert Musgrove (16 August 1893–1934) was an English footballer who played in the Football League for Barnsley, Durham City and Leeds United.

References

1893 births
1934 deaths
English footballers
Association football midfielders
English Football League players
Barnsley F.C. players
Durham City A.F.C. players
Leeds United F.C. players